is the 38th single by Japanese entertainer Akina Nakamori. Written by Aki Shimogō and Satoshi Shimano, the single was released on January 21, 1999, by Gauss Entertainment under the This One label. It was also the second single from her 19th studio album Will.

Background 
"Ophelia" was used as the theme song of the NTV/YTV drama series , which also starred Nakamori. The B-side is the English-language song "To Be".

Chart performance 
"Ophelia" peaked at No. 29 on Oricon's weekly singles chart and sold over 38,500 copies.

Track listing 
All music is composed by Satoshi Shimano; all music is arranged by Masanori Kamide.

Charts

References

External links 
 
 

1999 singles
1999 songs
Akina Nakamori songs
Japanese-language songs
Japanese television drama theme songs